Laal Rang is a 2016 Indian Hindi-language black comedy crime drama film directed by Syed Ahmad Afzal and produced by Nitika Thakur and Krian Media. Randeep Hooda, Akshay Oberoi and Piaa Bajpai star in the lead roles. Set in Haryana, the film depicts the theft of blood from blood banks and how the lives of two friends involved in the trade get affected. The film released on 22 April 2016. It received mixed reviews, with praise for the story, performances and production values but criticism towards the slow screenplay.

Plot

Rajesh is a youngster who is in love with a fellow student Poonam. Rajesh meets Shankar, the owner of an illegal blood bank. Shankar also has had a heartbreak through a Punjabi girl Rashi whom he still misses. Though initially, Rajesh is not aware of Shankar's illegal trades, he likes it the instant he learns about it and becomes involved in earning quick money to impress Poonam. Slowly as the business kicks off, Rajesh starts showing off his money to Poonam. The cops who have got the hint of this business are also closing in on the illegal activity led by the Superintendent of police. Shankar confesses his crime and is arrested, saving Rajesh and Poonam's relationship. Five years later, Shankar is released from the prison and he reunites with Rajesh and Poonam. The couple have a son named Shankar.

Cast
Randeep Hooda as Shankar Singh Malik
Akshay Oberoi as Rajesh Dhiman
Rajniesh Duggall as SP Gajraj Singh
Pia Bajpai as Poonam Sharma
Meenakshi Dixit as Raashi
Shreya Narayan as Neelam
Rajendra Sethi as Pushpendra
Ashutosh Kaushik as Vishnu
Priya Gupta as Sunita
Jaihind Kumar as Harnaam
Abhimanue Arun as Suraj aka Draculla
Kumar Saurabh as Shani Baba
Rehan Kidwai as Dr. Sabharwal
Sanjay Dumroo as Mithuniya
Kulvinder Baksshish as Naresh
Pall Singh as Prakash
Atul Chouthmal as Sub Inspector Swaraj
Pushkar Anand as Prahlad

Release

Critical reception 
Mohar Basu of The Times of India gave it 2 stars out of 5, wrote that film is half-baked and unconvincing. Despite the grit, it never becomes a riveting film. Rohit Vats of Hindustan Times gave it 3 stars out of 5, wrote that movie has a shade grey and is much more high voltage than an ordinary thriller. Shubhra Gupta of The Indian Express gave it 1.5 stars out of 5, quoted that film is meant to be based on two `real life’ incidents, but it doesn't tell us which. Anna MM Vetticad of Firstpost criticized that title is hot but film is not.

Namrata Thakker of Rediff.com praised actor and criticized film by giving it 2.5 stars out of 5. Saibal Chatterjee of NDTV said that the characters aren't insignificant.

Music
The music for Laal Rang was composed by Shiraz Uppal, Vipin Patwa & Mathias Duplessy. The music rights of the film were acquired by T-Series.

Box office 
According to Box Office India, movie collected 2.68 crore in its lifetime on a budget of 10 crores.

References

Further reading

External links
 
 

2010s Hindi-language films
Films scored by Vipin Patwa
2016 crime drama films
2016 crime thriller films
2016 black comedy films
2016 films
Indian crime drama films
Indian crime thriller films
Indian black comedy films
Films set in Haryana
Films about organised crime in India
Films about friendship